Andrea Di Luisa (born 13 May 1982) is an Italian professional boxer who held the European Union super-middleweight title from 2013 to 2015.

Professional career
Di Luisa made his professional debut on 30 October 2008, scoring a fourth-round stoppage over Giuseppe Loffredo, who also debuted. All of Di Luisa's next ten fights were won by stoppage or knockout. On 20 May 2011, he won his first regional championship—the vacant WBC Silver International super-middleweight title—via unanimous decision over Ruben Eduardo Acosta. In his following fight, on 11 November 2011, Di Luisa suffered his first professional loss when he was stopped in the twelfth and final round by Mouhamed Ali Ndiaye. This would be Di Luisa's first of three attempts at winning the European Union super-middleweight title. His next attempt, almost exactly a year later on 23 November 2012, was also unsuccessful: this time he lost via corner retirement to Christopher Rebrasse.

On 20 December 2014, the third attempt would be the charm for Di Luisa, as he stopped Roberto Cocco in eleven rounds to win the vacant European Union super-middleweight title. This was a rematch from their first bout, which took place on 9 April 2010. Having vacated the title, Di Luisa next fought former super-middleweight world champion Lucian Bute on 15 August 2015, but was stopped in four rounds. On 30 January 2016, Di Luisa was stopped in five rounds by George Groves.

Professional boxing record

References

External links

Super-middleweight boxers
Light-heavyweight boxers
Living people
1982 births
Boxers from Naples
Italian male boxers